Konec básníků v Čechách is a 1993 Czech comedy film directed by Dušan Klein and written by Klein with Ladislav Pecháček. The fourth installment in the "Poets hexalogy", the title is preceded by How the World Is Losing Poets (1982), How Poets Are Losing Their Illusions (1985), and How Poets Are Enjoying Their Lives (1988), and followed by Jak básníci neztrácejí naději (2004) and Jak básníci čekají na zázrak (2016). The film stars Pavel Kříž, David Matásek, Tereza Brodská, and Míla Myslíková. Set to a backdrop of the turbulent social changes after the Velvet Revolution in Czechoslovakia, the story focuses on Štěpán's struggle to adapt to new conditions brought about by the introduction of capitalism to the nation.

Synopsis
A few years after the Velvet Revolution, much has changed in Štěpán's life, as well as in his country. His best friend, Kendy, who now works as a reporter and advertising director, records an interview with Štěpán, which leads to the doctor's expulsion from the hospital where he works. He returns to his native Hradiště, where things have also changed. His mother still works as a seamstress, and she tries to find a job and partner for her divorced, unemployed, and disillusioned son.
While hunting for jobs, several of which he rejects on moral grounds, Štěpán meets the sensitive and principled pharmacist Ute. In the end, Štěpán accepts work in a monastery, where nuns take care of mentally disabled children.

Cast and characters

 Pavel Kříž as Štěpán Šafránek
 David Matásek as Kendy
 Tereza Brodská as Ute
 Míla Myslíková as Štepán's mother
 Lenka Kořínková as Vránová
 Ondřej Vetchý as Karabec
 Josef Somr as Prof. Ječmen
 Eva Vejmělková as Alena
 Adriana Tarábková as Jeskyňka
 Barbora Štěpánová as Bedřiška
 Jana Hlaváčová as Tonička
 Pavel Zedníček as Písařík

 Marek Vašut as doctor
 Oldřich Navrátil as Nádeníček
 Josef Větrovec as director
 Tomáš Töpfer as Dr. Sahulák
 Antonín Procházka as hospital director
 Stanislav Zindulka as Lorenc
 Miroslav Táborský as Hanousek
 Hana Ševčíková as nun
 Markéta Hrubešová as secretary
 Stanislava Bartošová as patient
 Jaroslava Obermaierová as madam

References

External links
 

1993 films
1993 comedy films
Czech comedy films
Czech sequel films
1990s Czech-language films